Christina Rau (born Christina Delius; 30 October 1956 in Bielefeld) is the widow of Johannes Rau, President of Germany from 1999–2004.

Early life
Rau is the maternal granddaughter of former President Gustav Heinemann.  Her father was Eduard Delius, part in a long line of entrepreneurs in the textile industry of the Westphalian city of Bielefeld while her mother was Christa Heinemann, a daughter of the former President. Through her mother, Rau is the niece of theologian Uta Ranke-Heinemann. She attended boarding school in Switzerland (Hochalpines Institut Ftan) and the United Kingdom (Gordonstoun in Scotland, where Prince Andrew was a contemporary). Subsequently, she studied political science, economics and history at the University College of Wales and at King's College London.

Wedding
On 9 August 1982, she married Johannes Rau, 25 years her senior and a long-time friend of the Heinemann family, who was at that time the Prime Minister of the German state of North Rhine-Westphalia.

Activities
She was the patron of : 
 UNICEF Germany, 
 the Müttergenesungswerk, 
 the Bundesverband der Organtransplantierten, 
 the Deutsche Kinder- und Jugendstiftung 
 the Red Cross Youth of Germany.

Honours

Foreign Honours
 :
 Grand Cross of the Order of Honour for Services to the Republic of Austria
 :
 Grand Cross of the Order of the Cross of Terra Mariana
 :
 Grand Cross of the Order of the Falcon 
 :
 Commander Grand Cross of the Order of the Three Stars
 :
 Dame Grand Cross of the Order of Isabella the Catholic

References

External links
 Björn Engholm: Die First Lady, Spiegel Special 5/1999]

1956 births
People educated at Gordonstoun
Alumni of King's College London
Living people
People from Bielefeld
Spouses of presidents of Germany

Knights Grand Cross of the Order of the Falcon
Recipients of the Order of the Cross of Terra Mariana, 1st Class
Recipients of the Grand Decoration with Sash for Services to the Republic of Austria
Recipients of the Order of Isabella the Catholic
Dames Grand Cross of the Order of Isabella the Catholic
Recipients of the Order of Merit of Berlin
Johannes Rau